The Roxanne Wars is a well-known series of hip hop rivalries during the mid-1980s, yielding perhaps the most answer records in history. The dispute arose over a failed appearance at a radio promotional show. There were two Roxannes in question, Roxanne Shanté and The Real Roxanne.

History
In 1984, the hip-hop trio U.T.F.O., produced by the R&B group Full Force, released a single titled "Hanging Out," which did not do well. However, it was the single's B side, "Roxanne, Roxanne", a song about a woman who would not respond to their advances, that gained much attention and airplay.

Soon afterwards, 14-year-old Lolita Shanté Gooden walked outside a New York City housing project called Queensbridge, when she heard Tyrone Williams, disc jockey Mr. Magic, and record producer Marley Marl talking about how U.T.F.O. had canceled an appearance on a show they were promoting. Gooden offered to make a hip-hop record that would get back at U.T.F.O., with her taking on the moniker Roxanne Shanté, after her middle name. The three took her up on the idea, with Marley producing "Roxanne's Revenge". The single was released in late 1984, taking the original beats from an instrumental version of "Roxanne, Roxanne". It was very confrontational and laced with profanities, but was an instant hit that sold over 250,000 copies in the New York area alone. The original issue of the "Street Version" was recorded on tape in Marley Marl's apartment, entirely free-styled by Gooden in seven minutes and in only one take. The recording was pressed onto 100 copies which were rushed out onto the streets to combat U.T.F.O.'s "Roxanne, Roxanne" release. Select Records claimed copyrights on the instrumental which led Pop Art Records to negotiate an agreement where all future copies of "Roxanne's Revenge" would feature a different track. It was subsequently re-released in early 1985 with new beats, re-rapped and the obscenities removed.

Following this, U.T.F.O. and Full Force decided to release their own answer record. While not directly aimed at Roxanne Shanté, this record featured Elease Jack, who took on the moniker of The Real Roxanne (and was soon replaced by Adelaida Martinez). This also was a hit, but it may have also produced an undesired result: while there had been answer records before (such as the semi-disco song "Somebody Else's Guy" and "Games People Play"/"Games Females Play"), they usually ended with the second recording. But in this saga, with a third record in airplay, a whole new trend began. Roxanne Shanté responded back by releasing "Bite This" and "Queen Of Rox (Shanté Rox On)". The airwaves so became occupied with the "Roxanne" records that other MCs decided to get into the act. Over the next year, anywhere from 30 to over 100 answer records (according to different claims) were produced, portraying Roxanne's family, or making various claims about her. The ones that were more well-known were the following:

 "Sparky's Turn (Roxanne, You're Through)"
 "Roxanne's Doctor – The Real Man" by Dr. Freshh,
 "Do the Roxanne" by Dr. Rocx & Co.
 "The Parents of Roxanne" by Gigolo Tony & Lacey Lace, which answered both UTFO and Sparky D. It drew references from both "Roxanne's Revenge" and "The Real Roxanne" as if both represented the true Roxanne.
 "I’m Lil Roxanne" by Tanganyika, was a record by the then young artist named Tanganyika stating that she was the younger version of the original Roxanne.
 "Yo, My Little Sister (Roxanne's Brothers)" by Crush Groove (no connection to Krush Groove), which answered UTFO, Sparky D, and Dr. Freshh.
 "Rappin' Roxy: Roxanne's Sister" by D.W. and the Party Crew featuring Roxy, which reuses several lines from "The Real Roxanne" and attacks both UTFO and Sparky D.
 "Ice Roxanne" by Little Ice Another record answering Roxanne Shanté by a young female, who citing a line in "Roxanne's Revenge" tells Roxanne to "make up her mind" if she wanted a man or not.
 "Roxanne's a Man (The Untold Story—Final Chapter)" by Ralph Rolle, which claimed that Roxanne was actually a man who had been raped in prison, and then having "lost his manhood", turned himself into a woman after his release; and insulted UTFO for not realizing this.
 "The Final Word – No More Roxanne (Please)" by The East Coast Crew, the final record that told the world to end it all. East Coast Crew contained regulars from the 80's TV show on the USA Network Dance Party USA.

References

External links
Strictly Business "The Roxanne Wars Updated" - May 2011 32 Tracks
Fat Lace Magazine's Series on the Roxanne Wars, including samples from key songs
Let's Talk About the Female MCs Who Shaped Hip-Hop

1980s in music
Answer songs
Hip hop feuds
Diss tracks
1980s in hip hop music